Twitches Too is a 2007 Disney Channel Original Movie. It is the sequel to the Disney Channel Original Movie Twitches, released in 2005. The film began production in late April 2007 and was released on October 12. It aired during Disney Channel's Halloween Month. The Disney Channel Original Series, Wizards of Waverly Place, premiered following the film's premiere. The first trailer was released during the premiere of High School Musical 2. On its premiere night, the movie brought in 6.96 million viewers. For 15 years, it was the last non-musical Disney Channel Original Movie sequel to be produced until the release Under Wraps 2 (2022).

Plot
In the magical land of Coventry, Queen Miranda is in King Aron's study speaking to his portrait how much she misses him. She exits the room followed by a shadow, waves her hand and a wall conceals the opening. In the Earth dimension, Camryn makes a mess when she tries to magically put dishes into a dishwasher. Alex is living with them because she is going to Waverly University. Karsh and Ileana show up and announce they are getting married and that Miranda wants to see them. Alex does not go because she does not want to miss her first day of classes, so Camryn goes by herself, she then meets a handsome man named Demitri. She believes him to be a prince, but he is a powerless kitchen servant. At school, Alex meets Marcus, who is Camryn's ex-boyfriend. He mistakes her for Camryn until Beth tells him otherwise.

Alex and Camryn receive clues that their father is alive in the Shadowlands. Miranda believes that Thantos is becoming powerful again, and wants the girls to use a vanquishing spell during an eclipse, when their powers will be at their strongest. If they perform the spell, everything in the Shadowlands will be destroyed, including their father Aron. Alex does not want to do it, but Camryn finishes the vanquishing spell. Alex finds a possible way to bring Aron from the Shadowlands but brings back Thantos. He goes off to destroy Aron's Shadow, who was the shadow present on Earth. Camryn and Alex follow, and when Thantos takes Aron back to Coventry, everyone is locked out. Demitri helps them get into the castle. When asked how, he reveals that Miranda returned his powers to him. Together as one, Camryn, Alex, and Miranda bring Aron back and he defeats Thantos, who falls down a portal, sending him to the afterlife.

Karsh and Ileana marry. Everyone is there: David and Emily, their housekeeper, and even Beth and Marcus. Camryn and Demitri share a loving look. Then she waves to Beth while Marcus and Alex wink at each other. Marcus whispers to Beth: "I can't believe you're not more freaked out about this." Beth replies, "What's there to be freaked out about? I'm just jealous she's got this much room in the back of her closet." Karsh and Ileana exchange rings and Aron and Miranda pronounce them husband and wife. They kiss and have the reception. The twins, Ileana, Karsh, Miranda and Aron, are all chanting, "Go Twitches, Go Twitches!"

Cast
 Tia Mowry as Alexandra "Alex" Nicole Fielding / Artemis DuBaer
 Tamera Mowry as Camryn "Cam" Elizabeth Barnes / Apolla DuBaer
 Kristen Wilson as Miranda DuBaer, the twins' mother, Aron's wife and Thantos' sister-in-law. The Queen of Coventry.
 Patrick Fabian as Thantos DuBaer, Aron's brother, Miranda's brother-in-law and the twins' paternal uncle. Thought to have killed Aron.
 Kevin Jubinville as Aron DuBaer, the twins' father, Miranda's husband and Thantos' brother. Thought to have been killed by Thantos. Aron was able to cling to life in shadows.
 Pat Kelly as Karsh WarBurton, the Protector of Princess Artemis and Royal Servant of the King and Queen. Marries Ileana at the end of the film.
 Leslie Seiler as Ileana Warburton, the Protector of Princess Apolla and Royal Servant of the King and Queen. Marries Karsh at the end of the film.
 Chris Gallinger as Demitri, a servant in the royal kitchens. Camryn becomes smitten with him, thinking he is royalty. 
 Arnold Pinnock as David Barnes, Camryn's adoptive father and a very stressed individual.
 Karen Holness as Emily Barnes, Camryn's adoptive mother who is more laid back than her husband.
 Jackie Rosenbaum as Beth Fish
 Nathan Stephenson as Marcus Warburton, Camryn's ex-boyfriend.
 Jayne Eastwood as Norseng

Production

Casting
All of the cast reprises their roles, except for Jennifer Robertson who played Ileana in the original movie.  The character of Ileana is played by the actress Leslie Seiler in this sequel. David Ingram did not return as Aron, he was replaced by Kevin Jubinville.

Filming
Filming for Twitches Too began in April 2007 on location in Toronto with Casa Loma being one of the filming locations. More special effects were used in this movie than the original, so most scenes were filmed using a green screen. Scenes where certain cast members had to fly were also filmed with a green screen, and the actors wore harnesses. When filming, the castle set was elevated nine feet high to give the illusion that the cast were up really high. Green bands were also attached to the bottom of the castle set in order to edit the background elements during post-production that blended in with the world of Coventry.

References

External links
  
 
  TV.com entry

Television sequel films
2007 television films
2007 films
2000s English-language films
Disney Channel Original Movie films
American fantasy comedy films
Films set in Illinois
Films shot in Toronto
Films about witchcraft
Films directed by Stuart Gillard
Films about twin sisters
American sequel films
Films based on American novels
2000s American films